The Heemskerk–Van Lynden van Sandenburg cabinet was the cabinet of the Netherlands from 27 August 1873 until 3 November 1877. The cabinet was formed by Independent Conservatives (Ind. Con.) and Independent Liberals (Ind. Lib.) after the election of 1873. The right-wing cabinet was a majority government in the House of Representatives. Independent Liberal Conservative Jan Heemskerk was Prime Minister.

Cabinet Members

 Retained this position from the previous cabinet.
 Resigned.
 Served ad interim.

References

External links
Official

  Kabinet-Heemskerk/Van Lynden van Sandenburg Parlement & Politiek

Cabinets of the Netherlands
1873 establishments in the Netherlands
1877 disestablishments in the Netherlands
Cabinets established in 1873
Cabinets disestablished in 1877